Athanasios Tsimikalis (born 27 October 1946) is a Greek alpine skier. He competed in three events at the 1968 Winter Olympics.

References

1946 births
Living people
Greek male alpine skiers
Olympic alpine skiers of Greece
Alpine skiers at the 1968 Winter Olympics
Sportspeople from Athens